The 1950 Rutgers Queensmen football team represented Rutgers University in the 1950 college football season. In their ninth season under head coach Harvey Harman, the Queensemen compiled a 4–4 record and outscored their opponents 186 to 154.

Schedule

References

Rutgers
Rutgers Scarlet Knights football seasons
Rutgers Queensmen football